The Lena-Arena, also known as the airberlin world for sponsorship purposes, was Fortuna Düsseldorf's temporary stadium during the hosting of the Eurovision Song Contest 2011 at Fortuna's ESPRIT Arena.

History 
Following Lena Meyer-Landrut's, of whom the stadium would be named after, win representing Germany at the Eurovision Song Contest 2010, the 2011 edition of the contest was held in Düsseldorf in Fortuna Düsseldorf's ESPRIT Arena. As a result of this, Fortuna's stadium was rendered unusable for football for the final three home games of the 2010–11 2. Bundesliga season. Moves to the neighbouring cities of Mönchengladbach, Köln, Bochum, and Leverkusen were ruled out, as well as an expansion Fortuna Düsseldorf's previous stadium, the Paul-Janes-Stadion, for security reasons. Constructed by the Swiss-based Nussli Group in under 50 days, construction began in January 2011 on a budget of €2.8 million on Fortuna's training ground.

With a capacity of 20,168 and sponsored by Air Berlin and stylised as airberlin world, the stadium hosted its first game on 26 March 2011, with Germany under-17 beating Ukraine U17 2–0. Fortuna Düsseldorf won all three of their games hosted at the Lena-Arena, with Sascha Rösler scoring in every game hosted at the stadium. The club hold the unique record of winning every game in their home stadium. The stadium was dismantled at the end of May 2011.

List of games

References

Fortuna Düsseldorf
Air Berlin
Defunct football venues in Germany
Buildings and structures in Düsseldorf
Sport in Düsseldorf
Sports venues in North Rhine-Westphalia
Sports venues completed in 2011
2011 disestablishments in Germany
2011 establishments in Germany